Joseph-Louis Mundwiller (1886–1967) was a cinematographer. He was born in Mülhausen in Alsace following the region's annexation into the German Empire after the Franco-Prussian War. He worked in the French cinema. In 1909 he directed an early travelogue Moscow Clad in Snow.

Selected filmography
 Moscow Clad in Snow (1909)
 The Duel (1910)
 Princess Tarakanova (1910)
 Novel with a Double Bass (1911)
 The House of Mystery (1923)
 Le Brasier ardent (1923)
 A Foolish Maiden (1929)
 Chotard and Company (1933)
 Street Without a Name (1934)
 Paris-Deauville (1934)
 Odette (1934)
 Crime and Punishment (1935)
 The Man from Nowhere (1937)
 Thérèse Martin (1939)

References

Bibliography
 Lewis, Jon. Essential Cinema: An Introduction to Film Analysis. Cengage Learning, 2013.

External links

1886 births
1967 deaths
French cinematographers
Mass media people from Mulhouse